Possibilities is the forty-fifth studio album by American jazz pianist Herbie Hancock, released on August 30, 2005, by Hear Music and Vector Recordings.

Background 
The album features a variety of guest musicians such as Trey Anastasio, John Mayer and Carlos Santana. It earned Hancock two nominations at the 2006 Grammy Awards: Best Pop Collaboration with Vocals for "A Song for You" (featuring Christina Aguilera) and Best Pop Instrumental Performance for "Gelo na Montanha" (featuring Anastasio). A motion picture entitled Herbie Hancock: Possibilities, released on DVD-Video on April 18, 2006, depicts the recording of this album in many different discussions and performances with the collaborating artists. The DVD-Video also includes a demo CD with four of the 10 songs on the album.

Track listing
CD

Notes:
  signifies a co-producer
  signifies an additional producer

DVD-Video (2006)

 Introduction
 Christina Aguilera "A Song for You"
 Opening Credits/John Mayer "Stitched Up"
 Raul Midón "I Just Called to Say I Love You"
 Trey Anastasio "Gelo na Montanha (Ice On The Mountain)"
 Damian Rice & Lisa Hannigan "Don't Explain"
 Carlos Santana & Angélique Kidjo "Safiatou"
 Wayne Shorter

 Paul Simon "I Do It for Your Love"
 Brian Eno
 Annie Lennox "Hush, Hush, Hush"
 Jonny Lang & Joss Stone "When Love Comes to Town"
 Sting "Sister Moon"
 Hiroshima, Japan
 Nagasaki, Japan
 End Credits

Charts

Weekly charts

Year-end charts

Certifications

Notes

References

2005 albums
Albums recorded at Capitol Studios
Albums recorded at Record Plant (Los Angeles)
Hear Music albums
Herbie Hancock albums
Vector Recordings albums